

51001–51100 

|-id=023
| 51023 Benavidezlozano ||  || Paula G. Benavidez Lozano (born 1977) is an associate professor at Universidad de Alicante (Spain). Her research includes observation of trans-Neptunian bodies and modeling of collision processes, and the evolution and internal structure of small bodies. || 
|}

51101–51200 

|-id=166
| 51166 Huimanto ||  || Man-To Hui (born 1990) is a Chinese postdoctoral researcher at the Institute for Astronomy, University of Hawaii (Honolulu, Hawaii), whose studies include photometric and dynamical studies of active asteroids, and near-Sun asteroids and comets. || 
|-id=178
| 51178 Geraintjones ||  || Geraint H. Jones (born 1970) is head of planetary science at University College London's Mullard Space Science Laboratory. He leads the European Space Agency's Comet Interceptor mission, and studies the interactions between comets and the solar wind, as well as planetary magnetospheres. || 
|}

51201–51300 

|-id=261
| 51261 Holuša ||  || Jiří Holuša (1964–2011), educator at Ostrava Planetarium, Czech Republic || 
|}

51301–51400 

|-bgcolor=#f2f2f2
| colspan=4 align=center | 
|}

51401–51500 

|-id=406
| 51406 Massimocalvani ||  || Massimo Calvani (born 1947), Italian astronomer, director of the Astronomical Observatory of Padua and Asiago from 1999 to 2005 || 
|-id=415
| 51415 Tovinder ||  || Pat Tovsen (born 1951) and her husband Philip Inderwiesen (born 1953), American light pollution control advocates || 
|-id=419
| 51419 Deshapriya ||  || Prasanna Deshapriya (born 1989) is a postdoctoral researcher at LESIA-Paris Observatory (France) whose studies include imaging analysis, spectrophotometry and visible-infrared spectroscopy of small bodies by the Rosetta and OSIRIS-REx spacecraft. || 
|-id=430
| 51430 Ireneclaire ||  || Irene Claire Schwartz, mother of Michael Schwartz of Tenagra Observatories || 
|-id=431
| 51431 Jayardee ||  || James R. Durig (born 1935), astronomer and the father of Douglas Tybor Durig who discovered this minor planet || 
|}

51501–51600 

|-id=569
| 51569 Garywessen ||  || Gary Wessen (born 1949) has conducted archaeological research in western North America for over 40 years and has recorded over 250 new sites. He works with many Native American tribes, especially the Makah. He has also served as an officer for many archaeological associations. || 
|-id=570
| 51570 Phendricksen ||  || Peter B. Hendricksen (born 1951), electrical engineer, mathematician, accomplished classical guitarist and past president of the Black Hills Astronomical Society || 
|-id=599
| 51599 Brittany ||  || Brittany Johnson, niece of Loren C. Ball who discovered this minor planet || 
|}

51601–51700 

|-id=655
| 51655 Susannemond || 2001 JA || Susanne Marie Emond, American dietitian and friend of the discoverer || 
|-id=659
| 51659 Robohachi ||  || Robohachi is a robot exhibited in the exhibition hall on the 2nd floor of Hachinohe City Children's Science Museum. He has been popular with children as a symbol of the Museum since it first opened. He talks, winks, moves his head from side to side and stretches his arms when his function buttons are pressed. || 
|-id=663
| 51663 Lovelock ||  || James Lovelock (born 1919), chemist, inventor, earth system scientist and author || 
|}

51701–51800 

|-id=741
| 51741 Davidixon ||  || David Dixon (born 1947), American amateur astronomer, who operates Jornada Observatory, New Mexico Src || 
|-id=772
| 51772 Sparker || 2001 MJ || Steve Parker (born 1951), director of Hidden Valley Observatory || 
|}

51801–51900 

|-id=823
| 51823 Rickhusband ||  || Rick Husband (1957–2003), American astronaut, commander of the space shuttle Columbia (STS-107) || 
|-id=824
| 51824 Mikeanderson ||  || Michael P. Anderson (1959–2003), American astronaut, payload commander of the space shuttle Columbia (STS-107) || 
|-id=825
| 51825 Davidbrown ||  || David M. Brown (1956–2003), American astronaut, mission specialist on board the space shuttle Columbia (STS-107) || 
|-id=826
| 51826 Kalpanachawla ||  || Kalpana Chawla (1962–2003), American astronaut, mission specialist on board the space shuttle Columbia (STS-107) || 
|-id=827
| 51827 Laurelclark ||  || Laurel Clark (1961–2003), American astronaut, mission specialist on board the space shuttle Columbia (STS-107) || 
|-id=828
| 51828 Ilanramon ||  || Ilan Ramon (1954–2003), Israeli astronaut, payload specialist on board the space shuttle Columbia (STS-107) || 
|-id=829
| 51829 Williemccool ||  || William C. McCool (1961–2003), American astronaut, pilot of the space shuttle Columbia (STS-107) || 
|-id=895
| 51895 Biblialexa ||  || Bibliotheca Alexandrina, a revival of the old library at Alexandria || 
|}

51901–52000 

|-id=915
| 51915 Andry ||  || Andrea Casulli (born 2013), grandson of Silvano Casulli who discovered this minor planet || 
|-id=983
| 51983 Hönig ||  || Sebastian F. Hönig (born 1978), German amateur astronomer || 
|-id=985
| 51985 Kirby ||  || Jack Kirby (1917–1994), American comic book artist, writer, and editor || 
|}

References 

051001-052000